Nicolas Claude Bührer (born 14 February 1944, Biel, Switzerland) is a Swiss entrepreneur and former car racing driver.

Career 
Bührer is co-owner and long-time managing director of Bührer & Co. AG, a construction company founded in 1937, which also sells and repairs construction machinery. A connection between Nicolas Bührer's family and Bührer Traktorenfabrik AG in Hinwil cannot be deduced from the available sources.

Career as a racing driver 
Bührer was active in the sports car scene as a driver in the 1970s and 1980s and currently competes in hill climbs with historic racing cars in a Porsche 911 Carrera RSR and a BMW M1. In 1981, he and Angelo Pallavicini won the Hockenheim 3-hour race in a Porsche 934. He competed in the German racing championship in 1974, the Spa-Francorchamps 24-hour race in 1975 and Le Mans in 1976.

References

External links 
 Nicolas Bührer career summary at DriverDB.com
 Nicolas Bührer at RacingSportsCars.com

Swiss businesspeople
Swiss racing drivers
24 Hours of Spa drivers
24 Hours of Le Mans drivers
Living people
1944 births